Bernie Massey (born 12 August 1939) is a former Australian rules footballer who played with Melbourne in the Victorian Football League (VFL) during the 1960s.

Massey played mostly as a fullback and starred in Melbourne's 1964 premiership side, keeping Collingwood full-forward Ian Graham goalless in the Grand Final. His last VFL season was in 1967 and he went on to become the captain-coach of Eltham Football Club.

References

1939 births
Australian rules footballers from Victoria (Australia)
Melbourne Football Club players
Eltham Football Club players
Eltham Football Club coaches
Living people
Melbourne Football Club Premiership players
One-time VFL/AFL Premiership players